Mawal could refer to

 Mawwal, a traditional genre of vocal Arabic music
 Mawal, a region in Maharashtra, India
 Mawala, the soldiers from the Mawal region who served in Shivaji's army